Tom Thornton (born 11 July 1989) is an Australian cricketer. He played in two first-class matches for South Australia in 2011.

See also
 List of South Australian representative cricketers

References

External links
 

1989 births
Living people
Australian cricketers
South Australia cricketers
Sportspeople from Canberra